Mary Aline Langdon McDermott (October 23, 1881 – February 16, 1951) was an American actress. She created the role of Mrs. Lily Mortar in the original Broadway production of Lillian Hellman's The Children's Hour (1934). She was also in the original Broadway cast of Thornton Wilder's Our Town (1938).

Early life 
McDermott was born in Jersey City, New Jersey, the daughter of Allan Langdon McDermott and Margaret Elizabeth O'Neill McDermott. Her father was a lawyer and a Congressman.

Career 
McDermott was a stage actress. Her Broadway credits included roles in The Runaway (1911), Go West, Young Man (1923), Bachelors' Brides (1925), American Born (1925), The Rhapsody (1930), Page Pygmalion (1932), The Children's Hour (1934–1936), Our Town (1938), Blind Alley (1940), and State of the Union (1945–1947). She also appeared on the London stage. She was a leading lady in touring and stock companies including the Northampton Players, and was known for counseling young women away from a stage career.

Personal life 
McDermott was a noted amateur photographer in the 1910s. She injured her arm when she slipped on an icy sidewalk in 1936. She died in 1951, in New York City.

References

External links 

 Aline McDermott as Mrs. Lily Mortar, a photograph in the collection of the Museum of the City of New York
 
 

1881 births
1951 deaths
People from Jersey City, New Jersey
20th-century American actresses